CSO Ada Ankara (Presidential Symphony Orchestra Concert Hall) is the musical campus in Ankara, where the symphonic concert hall which hosts the Presidential Symphony Orchestra is located.

The complex houses 2023-seat CSO Main Hall, the 500-seat Blue Hall,  the 650-seat old orchestra building (historical CSO), a 10000 capacity open-air concert area and the CSO Museum.  It was designed by Semra and Özcan Uygur of Uygur Architects whose project was chosen among over forty-five other entries to the National Architectural Competition in 1992, constructed between 1995 and 2020. The project entailed construction of three air-formed membrane buildings. The main concert hall's air-formed membrane inflated in 2012.

Opened with gala concerts held on December 3, 4 and 5 and it became the first concert hall in the world to open after the Elbphilharmonie in Berlin which was completed in 2017.

The venue constitutes an indoor area of 62,547 square meters and In addition to the Turkish Presidential Orchestra, hosts the State Polyphonic Choir,  Turkic World Music Ensemble,  State Classical Turkish Music Choir, State Turkish Folk Music Choir, and State Folk Dances Ensemble.

Located in a relatively abandoned urban landscape that sees both Anıtkabir and the historic Ankara Citadel; it symbolizes the dialogue of the premodern and modern-republican histories of the city established through the triangular prism foyer.  In addition to foyer campus includes two more buildings: the egg-shaped dome designed as the Symphony Orchestra Hall and the sphere dome designed as Chamber Orchestra Hall.

References 

Entertainment venues in Ankara
Concert halls in Ankara
Culture in Ankara
Music in Ankara
Concert halls in Turkey
Music venues completed in 2020
2020 establishments in Turkey
21st-century architecture in Turkey